Petersburg is an unincorporated community in Scioto Township, Jackson County, Ohio, United States.

The Johnson Road Covered Bridge is located just southwest of Petersburg, on Johnson Road.

References 

Unincorporated communities in Jackson County, Ohio